Arganiella exilis is a species of very small freshwater snail with an operculum, an aquatic operculate gastropod mollusks in the family Hydrobiidae. This species is endemic to France.

References 

Hydrobiidae
Endemic molluscs of Metropolitan France
Gastropods described in 1867
Taxonomy articles created by Polbot
Taxa named by J.J.I. Alcide de Paladilhe
Taxobox binomials not recognized by IUCN